A tea bag is a sealed bag containing tea leaves for brewing tea.

To tea bag may also refer to:
 Teabagging (sexual act), a man placing his scrotum in the mouth, or on the face, of another person. (Also, the name for a mocking gesture in multiplayer online video games where the victorious player simulates the movement over their defeated opponent.)

Fiction 
 T-Bag, a children's television series character
 Theodore "T-Bag" Bagwell, a character on the television show Prison Break

Politics
 Tea bag protests, another name for the Tea Party protests
 Teabagger, a controversial pejorative term for Tea Party movement participants